Jacob Corneliszoon van Neck (often anglicized to Jacob Cornelius van Neck) (1564–1638) was a Dutch naval officer and explorer who led the second Dutch expedition to Indonesia from 1598 to 1599.

Early life
Van Neck was from an Amsterdam family in good standing, and received a thorough education.  Since he came from a commercial background and was not experienced in sailing, he took extra classes in navigation.

Second Dutch Expedition
 
Following the success of the first Dutch expedition to Indonesia in 1597, Van Neck was chosen to lead a second expedition in 1598, with the purpose of bringing back various spices.  In May 1598, he left the port of Texel with eight vessels under his command.  He was accompanied by Vice-Admiral Wybrand van Warwyck and noted polar explorer Jacob van Heemskerk.  Following sailing directions written by Petrus Plancius, they made excellent progress, reaching the Cape of Good Hope in only three months.

Soon after this, heavy storms separated Van Neck, with three ships, from the rest of the fleet under Warwyck.  Neck landed on the east coast of Madagascar and refreshed his supplies, then continued on towards the Indonesian city of Bantam.  He reached it on November 25, 1598, after less than seven months of sailing.  Within one month, all three of his ships had been filled with spice, and on December 31 the other half of the fleet sailed into port at Bantam, prompting a huge New Year's celebration.  Van Neck filled one more ship full of spices, making four ready to be sailed back to Amsterdam, then sent Warwyck and Heemskerck with the other four ships to the east in order to procure more spices.  Van Neck then took the four ships that had been loaded with spices back to Amsterdam, where he arrived July, 1599.

He brought back with him nearly one million pounds in weight of pepper and cloves, in addition to half a ship full of nutmeg, mace, and cinnamon.  The explorers were greeted by an ecstatic Amsterdam and paraded through the city behind a band of trumpeters, with every church bell tolling.  The merchants who had backed the voyage rewarded Van Neck with a gold beaker (it later turned out to be only gold-plated) and the crew were given as much wine as they could drink.
  
The voyage was a tremendous success, earning the backers a 400 percent return on their investment.

Later life
Van Neck made one more expedition to the Indies after his voyage of 1598, losing three fingers while doing battle with a Spanish-Portuguese fleet near Ternate.  He retired from exploring after that, and later became a mayor of Amsterdam, and alderman, and a member of two admiralty colleges.  He died on March 8, 1638.

Notes

References

External links

1564 births
1638 deaths
Admirals of the navy of the Dutch Republic
16th-century Dutch explorers
N
Sailors on ships of the Dutch East India Company
Military personnel from Amsterdam
Mayors of Amsterdam
17th-century Dutch politicians